Héctor Herrera Ortiz (born May 23, 1959) is a retired 800 metres runner from Cuba who won an Olympic silver medal in 4 x 400 metres relay in 1992 Barcelona, together with teammates Lázaro Martínez, Norberto Téllez and Roberto Hernández.

Herrera also won a silver medal in 800 metres at the 1993 Central American and Caribbean Games.

International competitions

External links
 

1959 births
Living people
Cuban male middle-distance runners
Pan American Games medalists in athletics (track and field)
Pan American Games gold medalists for Cuba
Pan American Games bronze medalists for Cuba
Athletes (track and field) at the 1983 Pan American Games
Athletes (track and field) at the 1991 Pan American Games
Athletes (track and field) at the 1992 Summer Olympics
Olympic athletes of Cuba
Olympic silver medalists for Cuba
Medalists at the 1992 Summer Olympics
Olympic silver medalists in athletics (track and field)
World Athletics Championships athletes for Cuba
Goodwill Games medalists in athletics
Central American and Caribbean Games silver medalists for Cuba
Central American and Caribbean Games bronze medalists for Cuba
Competitors at the 1990 Central American and Caribbean Games
Competitors at the 1993 Central American and Caribbean Games
Central American and Caribbean Games medalists in athletics
Competitors at the 1990 Goodwill Games
Medalists at the 1983 Pan American Games
Medalists at the 1991 Pan American Games
20th-century Cuban people